The Adventures of Baron Munchausen is a 1988 adventure fantasy film co-written and directed by Terry Gilliam, and starring John Neville, Sarah Polley, Eric Idle, Jonathan Pryce, Oliver Reed, Robin Williams and Uma Thurman. An international co-production between the United Kingdom, the United States and Germany, the film is based on the tall tales about the 18th-century German nobleman Baron Munchausen and his wartime exploits against the Ottoman Empire.

The film was a notorious box office bomb, grossing just $8 million, losing Columbia Pictures $38 million. Despite this, it received positive reviews from critics and was nominated for four Academy Awards: Best Art Direction, Best Costume Design, Best Visual Effects and Best Makeup.

Plot
In an unnamed war-torn European city in the "Age of Reason", amid explosions and gunfire from a large Ottoman army outside the city gates, a fanciful touring stage production of Baron Munchausen's life and adventures is taking place. In a theatre box, the mayor, "The Right Ordinary Horatio Jackson", reinforces the city's commitment to reason by ordering the execution of a soldier who had just accomplished a near-superhuman feat of bravery, claiming that his bravery is demoralizing to other soldiers and citizens.

Not far into the play, an elderly man claiming to be the real Baron interrupts the show, protesting its many inaccuracies. Over the complaints of the audience, the theatre company and Jackson, the "real" Baron gains the house's attention and narrates through flashback an account of one of his adventures, of a life-or-death wager with the Grand Turk, where the younger Baron's life is saved only by his amazing luck plus the assistance of his remarkable associates: Berthold, the world's fastest runner; Adolphus, a rifleman with superhuman eyesight; Gustavus, who possesses extraordinary hearing, and sufficient lung power to knock down an army by exhaling; and the fantastically strong Albrecht.

When gunfire disrupts the elderly Baron's story, Jackson cancels the acting troupe's contract because of the Baron. The Baron wanders backstage, where the Angel of Death tries to take his life, but Sally Salt, the young daughter of the theater company's leader, saves him and persuades him to remain living. Sally races to the wall yelling for the Turkish army to go away, and the Baron accidentally fires himself through the sky using a mortar and returns riding a cannonball, narrowly escaping the Angel of Death once again. Insisting that he alone can save the city, the Baron escapes over the city's walls in a hot air balloon constructed of women's underwear, accompanied by Sally as a stowaway.

The balloon expedition proceeds to the Moon, where the Baron, who has grown younger, finds his old associate Berthold, but angers the King of the Moon (Robin Williams in an uncredited role), a giant with separate minds in his head and body, who resents the Baron for his romantic past with the Queen of the Moon. The death of the King's body, and a bungled escape from the Moon, brings the trio back to the Earth, and into the volcano of the Roman god Vulcan. He hosts the group as his guests and reveals Albrecht is working as his servant. The Baron and Vulcan's wife, Venus, attempt a romantic interlude by waltzing in the air, but this cuts short the hospitality and Vulcan expels the foursome from his kingdom into the South Seas.

Swallowed by an enormous sea creature, the travellers locate Gustavus, Adolphus, and the Baron's trusty horse Bucephalus. The Baron (who again appears elderly after being "expelled from a state of bliss") encounters the Angel of Death for the fourth time. Finally they escape by blowing "a modicum of snuff" out into the sea creature's cavernous interior, causing it to sneeze the heroes out through its whale-like blowhole. The Baron, young once again, sails to where the Turkish army is located but the Baron's associates are too elderly and tired to fight.

The Baron lectures them firmly but to no avail, and he storms off intending to surrender to the Grand Turk. His companions rally to save the Baron, and through a series of fantastic acts they rout the Turkish army away and liberate the city. During the city's celebratory parade, the Baron is shot dead by Jackson and the Angel of Death appears a final time to take the Baron's life. An emotional public funeral takes place, but the denouement reveals that this is merely the final scene of yet another story the Baron is telling to the same theater-goers in the city. The Baron calls the foregoing "only one of the many occasions on which I met my death" and closes his tale by saying "everyone who had a talent for it lived happily ever after".

The Baron leads the citizens to the city gates to reveal the city has indeed been saved, though it is unclear if the events of the battle occurred in a story or in reality. Sally asks, "It wasn't just a story, was it?" The Baron grins, rides off on Bucephalus, and then disappears.

Cast

In addition, Robin Williamscredited as "Ray D. Tutto" (a play on "king of everything" in Italian)portrays The King of the Moon. Director Terry Gilliam explains, "The deal was that we couldn't use his [Williams] name because his agents said, 'We don't want you pimping his ass for your film.' [...] so that's why Robin is not credited." Sting has a credited cameo as a soldier executed for being a hero ("behaviour demoralizing to ordinary soldiers"), and Gilliam also has an uncredited cameo as an irritating singer.

Production

Background
Tall tales based loosely on the German adventurer Hieronymus Karl Friedrich Freiherr von Münchhausen, or Baron Munchausen, were compiled by Rudolf Erich Raspe and published for English readers in 1785 as The Surprising Adventures of Baron Munchausen (or Baron Munchausen's Narrative of his Marvellous Travels and Campaigns in Russia). The tales were further embellished and translated back to German by Gottfried August Bürger in 1786. These tales were frequently extended and translated throughout the 19th century, further fictionalized in the 1901 American novel Mr. Munchausen.

The stories were adapted into various films including Baron Munchausen's Dream (1911, Georges Méliès), Münchhausen (1943, Josef von Báky with script by Erich Kästner), The Fabulous Baron Munchausen (1961, Karel Zeman), and The Very Same Munchhausen (1979) directed by Mark Zakharov, who depicted Munchausen as a tragic character, struggling against the conformity and hypocrisy of the world around him.

Budget
The film was over budget; what was originally $23.5 million grew to a reported $46.63 million. Gilliam, acknowledging he had gone over budget, said its final costs had been nowhere near $40 million.

In The Madness and Misadventures of Munchausen (included on the bonus DVD of the 20th Anniversary Edition of Munchausen), producer Thomas Schühly said that as part of a deal with 20th Century Fox before it ended up with Columbia, a budget plan had been set up for $35 million, "and it's strange, the [film's] final cost was 35 [million]. ... We always had a budget of 34 or 35 million, the problem was when I started to discuss it with Columbia, Columbia would not go beyond 25. ... Everybody knew from the very beginning that this cutting out was just a fake. ... The problem was that David Puttnam got fired, and all these deals were oral deals. ... Columbia's new CEO, Dawn Steel, said 'Whatever David Puttnam [has] said before doesn't interest me'".

Regarding the new regime's apparent animosity towards all of Puttnam's projects and Munchausen, Gilliam added in the same documentary, "I was trying very hard to convince Dawn Steel that this was not a David Puttnam movie, it was a Terry Gilliam movie." Similarly Kent Houston, head of Peerless Camera doing the film's special effects, said in Madness and Misadventures that they were promised a bonus if they would finish the effects in time, but when they approached the person again when they were done, he was met with the reply, "I'm not gonna pay you, because I don't want to seem to be doing anything that could benefit Terry Gilliam."

Experience
Munchausen is the third entry in Gilliam's "Trilogy of Imagination", preceded by Time Bandits (1981) and Brazil (1985). All are about the "craziness of our awkwardly ordered society and the desire to escape it through whatever means possible." Gilliam explains that, "The one theme that runs through all three of these pictures is a consistently serious battle between fantasy and what people perceive as reality." All three films focus on these struggles and attempts to escape them through imagination: Time Bandits, through the eyes of a child, Brazil, through the eyes of a man in his thirties, and Munchausen, through the eyes of an elderly man.

When the production finally came to a successful closure, several of the actors commented on the rushed tightness of the whole project. Said Eric Idle, "Up until Munchausen, I'd always been very smart about Terry Gilliam films. You don't ever [want to] be in them. Go and see them by all means – but to be in them, fucking madness!!!"

Sarah Polley, who was nine years old at the time of filming, described it as a traumatic experience. "[I]t definitely left me with a few scars ... It was just so dangerous. There were so many explosions going off so close to me, which is traumatic for a kid whether it's dangerous or not. Being in freezing cold water for long periods of time and working endless hours. It was physically grueling and unsafe." She further elaborated on her experience in her 2022 memoir Run Towards the Danger, writing "Though (Gilliam) was magical and brilliant and made images and stories that will live for a long, long time, it’s hard to calculate whether they were worth the price of the hell that so many went through over the years to help him make them."
Nevertheless, on October 30th, 2022, she tweeted: "you have my unconditional permission to still love this movie" to people who were wondering whether they could "still like this movie after hearing about [her] horrible experiences working on it as a child", adding in a second tweet that "Yes, it was traumatic for me. Yes, it should have been handled very differently. Yes, it is still a great movie. The joy that comes from it is the joy I am able to carry with me as well as the terrible memories. So go nuts. Enjoy it. You have my blessing."

Production designer Dante Ferretti afterwards compared Gilliam to his former director, saying, "Terry is very similar to Fellini in spirit. Fellini is a wilder liar, but that's the only difference! Terry isn't a director so much as a film author. He is open to every single idea and opportunity to make the end result work. Often the best ideas have come out of something not working properly and coming up with a new concept as a result. He is very elastic and that's one quality in a director that I admire the most."

Release

When The Adventures of Baron Munchausen was finally completed, David Puttnam, who had obtained the film's US distribution rights for Columbia Pictures, had been replaced as CEO of Columbia; coupled with Gilliam's prior quarrels with major studios over Brazil, the film saw only very limited distribution in the US, earning $8 million in US box office. The UK box office was £1,917,499.

In Madness and Misadventures, Robin Williams commented on the low number of release prints that Columbia produced, saying "[Puttnam's] regime was leaving, the new one was going through this, and they said, 'This was their movie, now let's do our movies!' It was a bit like the new lion that comes in and kills all the cubs from the previous man."

In a 2000 interview with IGN, Gilliam said about the contemporary press perception of the film being a financial disaster how "It seemed actually appropriate that Munchausen—the greatest liar in the world—should be a victim of some of the greatest liars in the world." He compared the film's budget problems to the even more serious problems of We're No Angels that commonly go unmentioned, and he went on to declare its difficulties as a mixture of "trade press" still being upset about Gilliam's battle with Universal over Brazil, nepotism, and an intrigue on behalf of Ray Stark successfully trying to have Puttnam removed from Columbia, coupled with the fact the studio was being sold at the time:

The negative stories about the shoot that were turning up in the Hollywood press were coming, we found out later, from a source at Film Finances—which was the completion bond company on the film. Their lawyer was a guy named Steve Ransohoff, whose father was Martin Ransohoff—who was Ray Stark's friend and partner. [...] I thought it was quite extraordinary, because the stories were doing two things—they were making me and the whole project look like it was completely out of control and all my fault, and that Film Finance, the completion guarantors, were the only thing holding it together—the people trying to bring control to it... the fact was, they were absolutely useless.

The ultimate fact was that when the film was ultimately released, there were only 117 prints made for America—so it was never really released. 117 prints! ...an art film gets 400. We were ultimately the victim of Columbia Tri-Star being sold to Sony, because at that time all they were doing was trying to get the books looking as good as possible. We weren't the only film that suffered, but we were the most visible one. And what happened—to complete the story in a neat and tidy way—was that they were not spending any money on advertising to promote any of the movies started by the previous regime—by Putnam's regime. They were burying films left right and center by spending no money on them—and the books looked really good at the end of that.

The joke is, if you look back, we got the best reviews and we were doing the best business in the opening weeks of any film they had released since Last Emperor. We actually opened well in the big cities—we opened really well. A friend who had bought the video rights said he had never seen anything so weird—Columbia was spending their whole time looking at exit polls to prove the film would not work in the suburbs, and so it would be pointless to make any more prints. He said, "I've never seen anything like this." There it was. Then it becomes this kind of legend—which it deserves to be... even if it's the wrong legend.

Reception
The Adventures of Baron Munchausen has a 91% approval rating on review aggregator Rotten Tomatoes based on 57 reviews, with a weighted average of 7.3/10. The site's consensus reads: "Bursting with Terry Gilliam's typically imaginative flourishes, this story of a possibly deranged Baron recounting his storied life is a flamboyant and witty visual treat". On Metacritic, it has a score of 69 out of 100 based on 15 critics, indicating "generally favorable reviews".

Regarding the obvious gap between the movie's troubled production and its eventual triumph of aesthetic cinematic form on the screen, Jeff Swindoll wrote in his 2008 DVD review of Munchausen for Monsters and Critics: "For the absolute hell that the production of the film turned out to be, you really don't see any of that tension on the screen. ... the film is a fantastic, whimsical treat. ... Baron Munchausen is full of whimsy, fantasy, bright colors, and fabulous characters. None is as fantastic as the Baron himself as played, with a twinkle in his eye, by the grand John Neville."

Roger Ebert gave the film 3 out of 4 stars and found that it was "told with a cheerfulness and a light touch that never betray the time and money it took to create them", appreciating "the sly wit and satire that sneaks in here and there from director Terry Gilliam and his collaborators, who were mostly forged in the mill of Monty Python. While considering the film's special effects as "astonishing", Ebert also contended "the movie is slow to get off the ground" and "sometimes the movie fails on the basic level of making itself clear. We're not always sure who is who, how they are related, or why we should care". But "allowing for the unsuccessful passages there is a lot here to treasure", and Ebert concluded overall, "this is a vast and commodious work", "the wit and the spectacle of Baron Munchausen are considerable achievements". Additionally, Ebert considered John Neville's title role performance as appearing "sensible and matter-of-fact, as anyone would if they had spent a lifetime growing accustomed to the incredible".

The Washington Post called the film a "wondrous feat of imagination", though "except for Williams, the actors are never more than a detail in Gilliam's compositions".

Richard Corliss wrote:

Everything about Munchausen deserves exclamation points, and not just to clear the air of the odor of corporate flop sweat. So here it is! A lavish fairy tale for bright children of all ages! Proof that eccentric films can survive in today's off-the-rack Hollywood! The most inventive fantasy since, well, Brazil! You may not believe it, ladies and gentlemen, but it's all true.

Vincent Canby called the film "consistently imaginative" and a "spectacle [that] is indeed spectacular and worth the admission price and patches of boredom"; he said the "major credit must go to Giuseppe Rotunno, the cameraman; Dante Ferretti, the production designer; Richard Conway, who did the special effects, and Peerless Camera Company Ltd., responsible for the optical effects. Without them, Baron Munchausen would have looked about as big and as interesting as a 25-cent postage stamp."

Accolades
The film was nominated for four British Academy Film Awards, winning three:

 Best Costume Design
 Best Make Up Artist
 Best Production Design
and losing Best Special Effects to Back to the Future Part II.

In 1990, the film was nominated for four Oscars:

 Best Art Direction (Dante Ferretti, Francesca Lo Schiavo) (lost to Batman)
 Best Costume Design (lost to Henry V)
 Best Makeup (lost to Driving Miss Daisy)
 Best Visual Effects (lost to The Abyss)

In 1991, the film was further nominated for four Saturn Awards:

 Best Costumes (lost to Total Recall)
 Best Fantasy Film (lost to Ghost)
 Best Make-Up (lost to Dick Tracy)
 Best Special Effects (lost to Back to the Future Part II)

It won the 1990 Italian National Syndicate of Film Journalists Silver Ribbon in three categories:

 Best Cinematography
 Best Costume Design
 Best Production Design

It was nominated in 1990 for a science-fiction Hugo Award for Best Dramatic Presentation (losing to Indiana Jones and the Last Crusade).

The child actress Sarah Polley was nominated for two Young Artist Awards in the categories Best Musical or Fantasy and Best Young Actress.

Home media

A laserdisc was released with features such as a commentary track by Gilliam and deleted scenes. The first DVD edition of the film, issued on 27 April 1999, did not include any of these or any other extras.

A 20th anniversary edition was released on DVD and Blu-ray on 8 April 2008. It includes a new commentary with Gilliam and co-writer/actor McKeown, a three-part documentary on the making of the film, storyboard sequences, and deleted scenes.

The Criterion Collection released the film on 4K Ultra HD and Blu-ray on 3 January 2023 with bonus features.

Comic book
The film was adapted into a comic series in 1989 by NOW Comics, The Adventures of Baron Munchausen – The Four-Part Mini-Series.

See also
 A True Story, an ancient Greek novel (2nd century AD), in which the protagonist meets the king of the moon and is later swallowed by a whale.

References

External links

 
 
 
 
 
 Celluloid Munchausen: The Cinematic Legacy of Baron von Münchhausen

1989 films
1980s fantasy adventure films
American fantasy adventure films
British fantasy adventure films
1980s English-language films
Films directed by Terry Gilliam
Moon in film
Films set in the 18th century
Films set in the Ottoman Empire
Films with screenplays by Terry Gilliam
Films with screenplays by Charles McKeown
Baron Munchausen
Films about old age
Films scored by Michael Kamen
Films about personifications of death
Films adapted into comics
Vulcan (mythology)
Venus (mythology)
1980s American films
1980s British films